Klaus Scherwinski (born 1976) is a German science fiction and role playing game illustrator.

Career

Klaus Scherwinski's first major project was his Kopeck superhero comic series published in 1999.
He provided the cover art for the Warhammer 40,000 novel Fifteen Hours (2005) by Mitchel Scanlon. Scherwinski drew several stories for writers Josef Rother and Boris Koch which were published in Horrorschocker.

Scherwinski's role-playing game work includes books for Shadowrun, GURPS, and MechWarrior. His comic book work for the U.S. market includes the G.I. Joe and Transformers series from IDW Publishing.

References

External links
 Home page
 Perry Rhodan
 
 Interview mit Klaus Scherwinski Storyboard Artist für Ryse: Son of Rome an der SAE Stuttgart on YouTube

1976 births
German comics artists
German illustrators
Living people